Edward Strachey, 1st Baron Strachie, PC (30 October 1858 – 25 July 1936), known as Sir Edward Strachey, Bt, between 1901 and 1911, was a British Liberal politician. He was a member of the Liberal administrations of Sir Henry Campbell-Bannerman and H. H. Asquith between 1905 and 1915.

Background
Strachey was the eldest son of Sir Edward Strachey, 3rd Baronet, and Mary Isabella (née Symonds). John Strachey, journalist, and Henry Strachey, artist, were his younger brothers and the Labour politician John Strachey his nephew.

Political career
Strachey was returned to Parliament for Somerset South at the 1892 general election, a seat he held until 1911, and served under Sir Henry Campbell-Bannerman and later H. H. Asquith as Treasurer of the Household from 1905 to 1909 and under Asquith as Parliamentary Secretary to the Board of Agriculture and Fisheries from 1909 to 1911. The latter year he was raised to the peerage as Baron Strachie, of Sutton Court in the County of Somerset. In 1912 he was admitted to the Privy Council and appointed Paymaster-General, a post he held until 1915. However, he was not offered a ministerial post when the 1915 coalition government was formed, and never returned to political office.

Family
Lord Strachie married Constance, daughter of Charles Bampfylde Braham, in 1880. He died in July 1936, aged 77, and was succeeded in his titles by his son Edward. Lady Strachie only survived her husband by a few months and died in December 1936.

References

External links 
 
 
 

1858 births
1936 deaths
Barons in the Peerage of the United Kingdom
Strachey, Edward
Members of the Privy Council of the United Kingdom
People educated at Summer Fields School
Treasurers of the Household
Strachey, Edward
Strachey, Edward
Strachey, Edward
Strachey, Edward
Strachey, Edward
Strachey, Edward
UK MPs who were granted peerages
United Kingdom Paymasters General
Edward, 1st Baron Strachie
Place of birth missing
Barons created by George V